HMS Penzance is a  commissioned by the Royal Navy in 1998. She is named after the seaside town of Penzance in Cornwall, and is the fourth vessel to bear the name.

In this role, crews for Penzance rotate every four months.

Both vessels remained afloat and were able to berth safely. Penzance returned to U.K. waters from the Persian Gulf in the summer of 2022.

References

External links

Sandown-class minehunters
Ships built in Southampton
1997 ships
Minehunters of the United Kingdom